Melissano is a town and comune in the province of Lecce, part of the Apulia region of south-east Italy.

References 

Cities and towns in Apulia
Localities of Salento